Pop is the fourth album by Wolfgang Voigt's Gas project, released on 28 March 2000 on Mille Plateaux. At the time of its release, reviews noted 'a striking left turn' in the sound, compared to other Gas releases; the album sounds considerably crisper, with a less muffled kickdrum and less of the 'underwater' quality present on other releases under the name.

Pop is the only Gas album to be released identically on vinyl and compact disc. The third song would appear in an extended format in Gas' second box set, Box.

Reception

Pop was named the sixth best album of the 2000s by Resident Advisor and the 85th best of the decade by online magazine Pitchfork. In 2016, Pitchfork ranked it the 11th best ambient album of all time.

Track listing

References

Gas (musician) albums
2000 albums